Rediu is a commune in Neamț County, Western Moldavia, Romania. It is composed of four villages: Bețești, Poloboc, Rediu, and Socea.

The commune is located in the southern part of the county, close to the border with Bacău County, on the right bank of the river Bistrița. It is crossed by the county road DJ159C, which connects it to the north to Borlești and to the south to Cândești.

The fir beam Saints Voievodes Church dates from around 1825; it is located on a hill in the village of Rediu, next to the village cemetery.

References

Communes in Neamț County
Localities in Western Moldavia